Royal Air Force West Beckham or RAF West Beckham is a former Chain Home radar station controlled by the Royal Air Force located   southeast of Holt, Norfolk and  southwest of Cromer, Norfolk, England.

RAF West Beckham opened in 1939 and closed in 1958. The station included a transmitter site, receiver site, generator site, underground reserves as well as two separate accommodation camps. It was known as Chain Home Station 32 and provided radar coverage for a large area of the North Norfolk coast.

History 

During the Second World War, several WAAFs were stationed here and B Site 'Marl Pit WAAF camp' located in nearby Bodham is well known to the local population.  The other accommodation site was known as C Site, home to Royal Norfolk Regiment in 1940, followed by Military Police and then RAF Regiment.

The radar site itself located at West Beckham was known as A Site.

The station Commander during World War II was famous dance band leader Marius B. Winter (1898–1956). Due to his background in the entertainment industry he was able to get good people in to entertain the people at the camp.  Every Sunday night, a dance would be held at B Site which was popular with the RAF, Army and locals alike. Winter was at West Beckham from 1942 until 1946.  Other Commanding Officers included F/L Gardner and F/L Ingham before Winter assumed command.  During the 1950s the Commanding Officers were F/L J.H.W Griffith, F/L T.Bradford, F/L R.W Chaston, F/L C.A Brown, F/L Keith Yexley followed by F/L William R. Jones.  Sometime during the late 1940s there was a F/L Melville in charge.  F/L Turpin an Australian and former Lancaster pilot was a radar officer at the station and sometimes acting CO.

In the 1950s very few dances were held at the station.  However each Friday night an event known as the Bodham Hop was held in Bodham village hall and was very popular with airmen and local girls alike.

During the war shift changes at RAF West Beckham were at 8 am, 1 pm and 6 pm.  During the 1950s radar at West Beckham was done on a dawn until dusk basis apart from during the odd exercise when 24 hours coverage was often provided.

After the Second World War, C Site went into care and maintenance. A Site closed in 1956 shortly followed by B Site in 1958. B Site lasted longer as it was also used by personnel from RAF Bard Hill.

The station had close links with the local fighter station RAF Matlaske.

RAF West Beckham reported to the filter room at RAF Watnall which was the HQ to No. 12 Group RAF during its life.  Originally RAF West Beckham was parented to RAF Bircham Newton, then RAF Wittering and finally RAF Coltishall.  The distance to Bircham Newton and especially Wittering proved a major disadvantage with daily trips to Coltishall needed for supplies.

The wooden masts were blown up in the summer of 1957, the metal masts were taken down in late 1957 and early 1958.

Remains
The station fence lasted until the early 1980s by when it had almost rusted away.

Today the station is in private ownership with many of the buildings still in existence.

References

External links
 Flickr - Photos of RAF West Beckham
 28 Days Later

Military units and formations established in 1938
North Norfolk
West Beckham
Military units and formations disestablished in 1958